Elyu-Ene may refer to:

 24701 Elyu-Ene, Hildian asteroid
 Lena River, by its original name in the Ewenki language